Phenylaminotetralins are novel histamine receptor ligands. Binding assays determined that (-)-trans-H2-PAT possessed the strongest binding affinity at the histamine H1 receptor.

References

Aminotetralins
Tertiary amines